2-Piperidinone (2-piperidone or δ-valerolactam) is a chemical compound classified as a lactam.  It is used as an intermediate in the preparation of other chemicals.

References